Island Arc is a peer-reviewed quarterly scientific journal that was established in 1992, covering "Earth Sciences of Convergent Plate Margins and Related Topics". It is published by Wiley-Blackwell on behalf of the Geological Society of Japan, in association with the Japan Association for Quaternary Research, Japan Association of Mineralogical Sciences, Palaeontological Society of Japan and the Society of Resource Geology.

Abstracting and indexing 
The journal is abstracted and indexed in EBSCO databases, Aquatic Sciences and Fisheries Abstracts, Cambridge Scientific Abstracts, Chemical Abstracts Service, Current Contents/Physical, Chemical & Earth Sciences, InfoTrac, ProQuest, Science Citation Index, Scopus, and The Zoological Record. According to the Journal Citation Reports, the journal's 2009 impact factor is 1.182, ranking it 82nd out of 153 in the category "Geosciences, Multidisciplinary".

See also
Island arc, the geographical and geological feature that the journal takes its name from.

External links

References

Earth and atmospheric sciences journals
Wiley-Blackwell academic journals
Quarterly journals
English-language journals
Publications established in 1992
Geology journals